The Overdose is the fourth studio album by rap group 11/5. It was released on November 2, 1999 on Dog Day, and featured production from T.C., The Enhancer, Mr. Laid, Chill Black and Sean T. This was the group's first studio album to not make it on any charts.

Track listing
"Overdose Intro" feat. Billy Jam – 0:39
"Cell Phone" – 3:58
"Blockstyle Murderah" – 4:09
Commercial By "No. 1 B*ch Killa" Ice Man – 0:37
"Parkin' Lot Pimpin'" – 3:06
"Back From Hell" – 4:35
"Yo Town Is Mine" – 3:37
"Live Another Day" – 4:00
"Scocious" feat. Black C – 3:58
"VIP'z" feat.  K.A.H. – 5:21
"All About Our Endz" – 3:19
"What I Need" – 3:34
"Timez Up" feat. Danita Coleman – 4:52
"STR8 Game" – 3:45
"Pimpin' Aint Easy" – 3:45
"Parkin' Lot Pimpin'" (Radio Edit) – 3:07

References

1999 albums
11/5 albums